Retiboletus is a genus of fungi in the family Boletaceae. The genus, first described in 2002, contains six species distributed in north temperate regions.

References

External links

Boletaceae
Boletales genera